The Charity Film Awards is a British film awards ceremony that is held annually. Each year campaign films are announced as winners following both a public vote and a final panel of judges.

Previous winners have included the RSPCA, Macmillan, and NSPCC. It is recognised by the British Film Institute and IMDb.

Background
The awards were first held in 2015 and founded by Simon Burton. They were founded to recognise the best campaigns or videos that had been created by UK charities. The videos could be about changing attitudes or behaviours or raising awareness about a particular topic. During its inaugural year, 375 charities entered with the first round as a public voting round. According to The Guardian, over 43,000 members of the public voted in 2015. The resulting shortlist is then presented to a panel of judges who vote for the yearly winner.

History
The Charity Film Awards' first ceremony in 2015 shortlisted a number of British charities, including RSPCA, Barnardo’s, the RNLI, Alzheimer’s Society, and Great Ormond Street Children's Hospital. The eventual winner was St. John's Ambulance for "The Chokeables."

As the number of entrants expanded, so did the number of categories at the awards. In 2019, Child Bereavement UK received the top award. During 2020, the charity film awards saw Carers UK take the top prize. The 2022 awards were held in Leicester Square, London.

References

 Film awards
British film awards